VAV (Hangul: 브이에이브이; shortened from Very Awesome Voice) is a South Korean boy band formed by A Team Entertainment (formerly AQ Entertainment) in Seoul, South Korea. The group consists of six members: St.Van, Ace, Ayno, Jacob, Lou and Ziu. They debuted on November 2, 2015, with the EP, Under the Moonlight.

History

On November 2, 2015, VAV debuted with their first EP, Under The Moonlight co-produced with CJ E&M together with their agency, A Team Entertainment. On May 10, 2016, they released their second EP, Brotherhood, and later released a repackaged version on July 1, 2016. Xiao left the group in June 2016, followed by Zehan in December 2016, finally followed by Gyeoul in January 2017.

On February 17, 2017, the group added three new members: Lou, Ayno and Ziu. on January 29, 2018, their third EP, Spotlight was released featuring previous singles.

On March 18, 2019, they released their fourth EP, Thrilla Killa.

On July 23, 2019, they released a summer special single, Give Me More featuring Puerto Rican singer De La Ghetto and Grammy-winning production duo Play-N-Skillz. “Give Me More” was released through three different versions, with the primary one performed in Korean with some English and Spanish sprinkled in while the second is entirely performed in Spanish and English; the final variant offers up a special Play-N-Skillz remix. An instrumental version of the song was also released.

VAV's fifth EP, titled Poison, was released on October 21, 2019, The EP contains five songs, including the lead single of the same name and its instrumental, and a track co-composed and co-written by Hui.

On September 7, 2020, Baron enlisted in the military.  VAV's sixth EP, titled Made For Two, was released on September 15, 2020, promoted as a six-member group.

On May 10, 2021, Ace enlisted in the military.  On the same day, they released the special digital single Always.

On July 12, 2021, Lou and Ziu enlisted in the military.

On October 31, 2021, VAV released the digital single "Cause I Miss You" to commemorate their sixth anniversary.

On December 26, 2022, it was confirmed by the agency that Lou and Ziu will be discharged from military service on January 11, 2023, and a complete comeback was announced.

Members

Current
Adapted from their Naver profile
 St.Van (세인트반) 
 Ace (에이스)
 Ayno (에이노)
 Jacob (제이콥)
 Lou (로우)
 Ziu (지우)

Former
 Xiao (샤오)
 Zehan (제한)
 Gyeoul (겨울)
 Baron (바론)

Timeline

Discography

Extended plays

Singles

Awards and nominations

7th Thailand Daradaily Awards

Mubeat Awards

Notes

References

External links
Official website

K-pop music groups
South Korean boy bands
South Korean dance music groups
Musical groups from Seoul
Musical groups established in 2015
2015 establishments in South Korea
South Korean pop music groups